Christine Wiltz (born January 3, 1948) is an American writer of mystery fiction. A native of New Orleans, Wiltz attended school at a number of different universities in Louisiana before completing a BA at San Francisco State College in 1969. Prior to becoming a full-time writer she held a number of jobs including advertising, grant writing, selling books, and short-order cooking. She has written four mystery novels featuring Neal Rafferty, a former member of the New Orleans Police Department turned private investigator. She has also written a biography of Norma Wallace, The Last Madam, and a standalone novel, Shoot the Money. Her writing has appeared in the New Yorker and the Los Angeles Times, and has been writer-in-residence and adjunct professor at Tulane University and Loyola University New Orleans. Wiltz is married; she and her husband survived Hurricane Katrina.


Works
Taken from:

Neal Rafferty series
The Killing Circle (1981)
A Diamond Before You Die (1987)
The Emerald Lizard (1991)
Glass House (1994)

Standalone novel
Shoot the Money (2013)

Non-fiction
The Last Madam (2000)

References

1948 births
Living people
American women novelists
American women biographers
Women mystery writers
American mystery writers
20th-century American novelists
20th-century American women writers
21st-century American novelists
21st-century American biographers
21st-century American women writers
Writers from New Orleans
Novelists from Louisiana
San Francisco State University alumni
Tulane University faculty
Loyola University New Orleans faculty